Comic books have been recalled for various reasons including simple printing errors, stories or images that were deemed inappropriate or to avoid potential lawsuits. The rarest of these books is probably The League of Extraordinary Gentlemen volume 1, issue #5, which was recalled due to the inclusion of a 19th-century advertisement for "Marvel"-brand douche; since League was published by an imprint of DC Comics, DC's publisher felt that this could be perceived as an attack on DC's main rival, Marvel Comics. Other notable recalls were the Elseworlds 80-Page Giant which included a portrayal of baby Superman in a microwave, and Marvel Knights' Elektra #3 which included tame nude images of the title character.

As well as comics with evidence of a genuine recall, there have been a number of rumored recalls and comics where the publisher (or distributor) has allowed the comic to be returned but has not issued a recall notice. Comic books have been categorized below as verified or unverified/returnable with supporting references.

Verified recalls
This section lists comics verified by the CGC Collectors Society as being recalled and listed in the "Recalled Editions" competitive comic book set.

Action Comics #869
November 2008, DC Comics: Action Comics #869, the penultimate issue of the "Brainiac" story arc, was recalled by DC Comics for cover content. The original cover depicted Superman, in civilian attire with his 'S' shield clearly visible, and his adoptive father outside the Kent farmhouse drinking what appears to be beer.

DC issued a statement to retailers that the issue was recalled, and that any copies featuring the original cover be destroyed. The next week, DC reprinted the issue featuring a cover in which the label on the bottle was changed to read, "soda pop".

All Star Batman and Robin, the Boy Wonder #10
August 2008, DC Comics:
All Star Batman and Robin, the Boy Wonder was a mature-readers comic in which street thugs used profanity. DC did not want this language to actually appear in the book, so the text was placed in the speech bubbles and then blacked-out. In issue #10, slightly different shades of ink were used in the two elements leaving the vulgar words just readable. Frank Miller commented on this incident: "This is the first I've heard of it. I have no idea how this awful thing happened. It's just one of those terrible and glorious things that happen time to time in publishing, ...And my first reaction is simple: I want at least three copies".

Elektra volume 2, #3
November 2001, Marvel Comics: Elektra appears nude in shadow.

Elseworlds 80-Page Giant
August 1999, DC Comics:
In Kyle Baker and Liz Glass' story, "Letitia Lerner, Superman's Babysitter", the super-toddler climbs into a microwave. When Paul Levitz, the president of DC Comics, objected to this portrayal of the infant Clark Kent, most copies were recalled and pulped. The story was subsequently reprinted in DC's Bizarro Comics collection. In 2011, the entire issue was reprinted under the title DC Comics Presents: Elseworlds 80-Page Giant #1. It went on sale December 28. and DC Comics Presents: Elseworlds 100-Page Spectacular #1.

Halle the Hooters Girl #1
January 1998, Cabbage Comics:
The San Antonio Texas (Gold Foil) Edition was specially produced (only 2000 made) for the National Tour of the swimsuit/calendar models who were the inspiration. However, a lawsuit ensued with the Hooters organization which led to the comic being recalled. The standard recalled edition is thought to be the rarer of the two versions although the set scores in the CGC registry seem to contradict this.

The League of Extraordinary Gentlemen Volume 1, #5
Issue #5 of Volume One contained an authentic advertisement for a Marvel-brand douche from the early part of the 20th century. This ad caused DC Comics executive Paul Levitz to order the entire print run destroyed over concerns that this could lead to litigation with their main rival Marvel Comics. None of the recalled comics were ever distributed in the US; however, a small batch had been shipped to the UK and escaped the destruction. With only 100 thought to exist this makes it more than 10-20 times rarer than the Elseworlds 80-Page Giant that Paul Levitz also recalled, and is probably the rarest modern comic book in existence.

In Top 10, Moore creates a "Miracle Douche Recall" headline on a newspaper.

The Matrix: Comic Book Preview
March 1999, Warner Bros.:
This comic was specially printed for the cinema audience for the film of the same title. The content was however deemed too mature for cinema audience and it was withdrawn and pulped. This comic, although recalled, retains a low value.

Millennium Edition: Mad #1
February 2000, DC Comics: This comic was a reprint of the original first issue of Mad, but inside DC Comics used their own masthead and copyright instead of EC's so it was withdrawn to be corrected. A very low number of these comic books have been encapsulated by CGC.

Phonogram: The Singles Club #5
October 2009, Image Comics:
Recalled and pulped due to a printing error that caused the bar-code from issue #4 to be used.

Star Wars: Return of the Jedi
May 1983, Marvel Comics: 
As reported in Comics Buyer's Guide #497 (May 27, 1983), actor and comic book fan Mark Hamill discovered copies of Marvel Comics' comic book adaptation of the Return of the Jedi film, on sale a month prior to the release of the film, and alerted Lucasfilm. According to Marvel's direct sales manager Carol Kalish, Marvel swiftly recalled the book off the stands upon learning this, though it did not prevent premature revelation of many of the film's secrets.

Tangled Web, the Thousand Spider-Man #1
June 2001, Marvel Comics:
The first issue of the comic was produced on the wrong paper stock giving it a matte finish. The comic was withdrawn and the cover reprinted on the correct stock.

Universe X Spidey #1
January 2001, Marvel Comics:
This alternate-universe Spider-Man book was recalled after it was discovered that artist Al Milgrom had hidden slanderous comments about former Marvel Comics editor Bob Harras within the issue. On page 28, panel 3, the spines of books on a bookshelf in the background read, "Harras, ha ha, he's gone, good riddance to bad rubbish he was a, Nasty (blurred), s.o.b." when the comic is turned sideways. The comic was distributed to retailers as part of the First Look scheme, in which retailers get to see a copy of next week’s issue, but then recalled and pulped when the slander was spotted. Milgrom was fired and then quietly rehired several weeks later.

Wolverine #131
November 1998, Marvel Comics:
This issue featured a genuine error where, instead of the word "killer", the antisemitic slur "kike" made it into Viper's description of Wolverine's archenemy Sabretooth.

Unverified recalls and returnable comics
This section lists comics that have been rumored as recalls or have been voluntarily returnable to the publisher (i.e. a recall notice was not issued).

Action Comics #309
February 1964, DC Comics:
In one of the stories in this anthology issue, Superman visits the White House, and trusts President John F. Kennedy with his secret identity. The story was produced shortly before Kennedy was assassinated, which led to the cancellation of its publication. It was eventually published months later.

Adventures of Superman #596
November 2001, DC Comics: 
This issue was shipped to stores the day after the 9-11 incident in New York City. Due to an unfortunate coincidence the Superman comic features a scene in which Metropolis' twin LexCorp Towers have sustained damage due to events in the "Our Worlds at War" storyline. DC quickly announced that the issue was returnable, although few, if any, were actually returned.

Conan and the Demons of Khitai #3
December 2005, Dark Horse Comics:
Conan and the Demons of Khitai #3 featured a spoof nude advert for Conan #24. After complaints, a second printing was issued, replacing the spoof nude advert with actual (non-nude) advert for Conan #24, with retailers offered the option to swap copies (hence not technically a recall).

Death: The High Cost of Living #3
May 1993, DC/Vertigo:
Page 19 and 20 in the first print were not facing each other, which led to this being corrected and reprinted.

Doctor Strange, Sorcerer Supreme #15
March 1990, Marvel Comics:
Jackson Guice's cover for Doctor Strange #15 (March 1990) used Christian music singer Amy Grant's likeness without her permission, leading to her management filing a complaint against Marvel Comics, saying the cover gave the appearance she was associating with witchcraft. A US District Court sealed an out-of-court settlement between Grant and Marvel in early 1991, with a consent decree that Marvel did not admit to any liability or wrongdoing.

Ka-Zar The Savage #12
March 1982, Marvel Comics: 
Most copies have a blank panel on the bottom left of page 10. About 1600 copies (of 80000 issues printed) show a red ink drawing of Dante in that panel. In the "Bullpen Bulletins" page in Marvel Comics cover-dated June 1982, Editor-in-Chief Jim Shooter humorously explains this with "The First Annual Shooter Awards". Shooter wrote: "The Award for Worst Engraver's Error goes to Chemical Color for Ka-Zar #12 "Belasco...!" in which an entire panel, a color-hold, was dropped out!"

Sandman #18 ("A Dream of a Thousand Cats")
August 1990, DC/Vertigo:
There are two versions of this issue where the first page has either three panels colored blue or the same three panels colored yellow. The blue panel variant is listed by CGC as an "error version" and very few are thought to exist.

Sandman #19 ("A Midsummer Night's Dream")
September 1990, DC/Vertigo:
Pages 18 and 19 printed in the wrong order (not recalled).

Spider-Man: Reign #1
December 2006, Marvel Comics:
On December 6, 2006, the same day that Spider-Man: Reign #1 shipped to retailers, Marvel issued an apology and a "CONTENT ADVISORY" statement, announcing that the issue was now returnable as it "contains an image that may be misinterpreted by some readers as inappropriate". This was due to a panel showing a naked and elderly Peter Parker sitting on a bed, an image in which his genitalia are apparently visible. Spider-Man: Reign had shipped with a T+ (Teens & Up) rating. The second printing avoided this problem by modifying the panel, hiding Parker's body in shadow.

Venom: Lethal Protector #1
February 1993, Marvel Comics:
Returnable (not recalled) due to "Black Cover" printing error.

References

Comic book collecting
Comics terminology
 Comics